Qaleh Nasir or Qaleh-ye Nasir may refer to:

Qaleh-ye Nasir, Khuzestan
Qaleh Nasir, Lorestan
Qaleh Nasir, South Khorasan